Mecistes is a genus of leaf beetles in the subfamily Eumolpinae. It is distributed in central and eastern Africa, from the Uele region and Kenya to Namibia, Botswana and the Eastern provinces of the Republic of South Africa, and in Saudi Arabia. It is related to the Oriental genus Apolepis.

Species
Species include:
 Mecistes audisioi Zoia, 2009
 Mecistes chapuisi Jacoby, 1900
 Mecistes flavipes (Gerstaecker, 1855)
 Mecistes grobbelaarae Zoia, 2009
 Mecistes lineatus (Pic, 1921)
 Mecistes seriatus Lefèvre, 1885
 Mecistes tarsalis Chapuis, 1874
 Mecistes thompsoni Zoia, 2009
 Mecistes ziliolii Zoia, 2009
 Mecistes zimbabweensis Zoia, 2009

References

Eumolpinae
Chrysomelidae genera
Taxa named by Félicien Chapuis
Beetles of Africa
Beetles of Asia